Yamadutas (Sanskrit: यमदूत)  are the messengers of death according to Hinduism, the agents of Yama, the god of the netherworld. They carry the departed souls of human beings who had not achieved moksha to Yamaloka, the underworld.

Mythology

Story of Ajamila 
The Yamadutas feature prominently in the story of Ajamila. Ajamila is described to be a Brahmin who once set out to the jungle to collect kusha grass. Ajamila met a beautiful Shudra woman on the way, and neglecting his duties, the Brahmin made her his wife. Ten children were born to them. When he was on his deathbed, when the messengers of Yama were waiting to take him to hell, he called out the name of his favourite son, Narayana, which was also an epithet of Vishnu. Upon this, the Vishnudutas, the messengers of Vishnu, prevented Yama's men from taking Ajamila to hell. The matter in dispute, the Yamadutas brought the Brahmin to an audience with Yama, and upon hearing the tale, the deity of death affirmed that the Vishnudutas were on the right, upon which the messengers of death extoled the glories of Vishnu. This legend is the origin of the belief that the Yamadutas steer clear of Vaishnavas, or in the very least carry them to Vaikuntha rather than Yamaloka.

See also
Psychopomp
Naraka (Hinduism)
Ajamila

References

Non-human races in Hindu mythology
Death deities